Fábio Alexandre Gomes Arcanjo (born 18 October 1995) is a professional footballer who plays as a midfielder for the Portuguese club S.C.U. Torreense. Born in Portugal, he represents the Cape Verde national football team.

International career
Arcanjo made his debut for the Cape Verde national football team in a 0-0 (4-3) penalty shootout win over Andorra on 3 June 2018.

Personal life
Arcanjo is the brother of the footballer Telmo Arcanjo.

References

External links
 
 
 FPF Profile

1994 births
Living people
Citizens of Cape Verde through descent
Cape Verdean footballers
Association football midfielders
Cape Verde international footballers
Footballers from Lisbon
Portuguese footballers
F.C. Alverca players
Casa Pia A.C. players
C.D. Pinhalnovense players
Clube Oriental de Lisboa players
S.C.U. Torreense players
Campeonato de Portugal (league) players
Portuguese sportspeople of Cape Verdean descent